Caleb Duarte Piñon is an American multidisciplinary artist who works with construction type materials, site-specific community performance, painting, and social sculpture and social practices.

Early life and education 
Caleb Duarte was born in the border town of El Paso, Texas where his family lived in Juarez, Mexico. At the age of four, Duarte and his family migrated from Nogales, Sonora to the farming community of Corcoran of California. He is one of four boys born to Francisco Duarte and Soledad Duarte Piñon. Siblings are Samuel Hiram Duarte, Josue Duarte, and David Duarte.

Duarte began to paint at an early age and began his studies at Fresno City College; later matriculating to the San Francisco Art Institute and then the Graduate Sculpture department of the School of The Art Institute of Chicago. He holds a Bachelors of Fine Arts, Painting (2003) from San Francisco Art Institute, and a Masters of Fine Arts, Sculpture (2009) from School of the Art Institute of Chicago, Chicago Illinois USA.

Caleb Duarte teaches sculpture at Fresno City College.

Career 
Duarte co-foundered and directed the international experimental artist residency and cultural hub of diverse practices, EDELO (Spanish acronym for 'Where the United Nations Used To Be') along with artist and activist Mia Eve Rollow in San Cristobal de Las Casas, Chiapas Mexico in 2009. The space invited participants of diverse disciplines to live and create in collaboration with autonomous indigenous communities. The diversity of residents included PhDs to jugglers; contemporary artists, activists, educators, rural farmers and community members of rural Chiapas. Notable residents include Emory Douglas; former Minister of Culture for the Black Panther Party, muralist Rigo 23, Favianna Rodriguez, Rupa Marya, and scholars such as Ramesh Srinivasan. Other notable participants in exhibiting artist and performances include Regina Galindo, Manuel Ocampo with Juan Carlos Quintana, Lisl Ponger. Performing artist include hip hop artist Olmeca, Manik B, and Climbing Poetree, Roco from Maldita Vecindad, Lengualerta.

Duarte has lectured on his work at the 2012 Creative Time Summit in New York City, the Otis School of Art and Design - San Francisco State University, The De Young Museum San Francisco, East Side Arts Alliance in Oakland, and the REDCAT Gallery in Los Angeles California amongst many others.

As the lead facilitator for ZAPANTERA NEGRA project, Duarte collaborated with Rigo 23 and Mia Eve Rollow; bringing in artist and once Minister of Culture for the Black Panther Party, Emory Douglas to work with the Zapatista. This project united Zapatistas with Black Panther esthetics to investigate the use of the body and visual communication in both distinct political and artistic movements.

Duarte was appointed as Oakland Arts Commissioner by then Mayor Jerry Brown in 2006.

Exhibitions 
Caleb Duarte has presented his work at numerous institutions, including Yerba Buena Center for the Arts, SF, Red Dot Art Fair in NY, The Sullivan Galleries in Chicago, Jack Fisher Gallery in SF, Gallery 727 Los Angeles, The Oakland Museum of California, the Fresno Art Museum and The Utah Museum of Contemporary Art, Bay Area Now 8, and many others. In addition, Duarte has created public works and community performances at the World Social Forum in Mumbai, India, Santiago de Cuba, Cuba, El Pital Honduras, Mexico City, and throughout the US.

Distinctions 
Recipient of the Creative Capital Award - 2019

References

External links
 

American multimedia artists
People from El Paso, Texas